Saint-Exupéry-les-Roches (Auvergnat: Sent Sepieri) is a commune in the Corrèze department in central France.

Geography
The river Diège forms all of the commune's southwestern boundary.

Population

See also
Antoine de Chabannes
Château de la Gane
Communes of the Corrèze department

References

Communes of Corrèze